Sara Muhammad Tawfiq Abdel Gawad (born February 15, 1982) is a synchronized swimmer, she represented Egypt at women's duet event in synchronized swimming at 2000 Summer Olympics in Sydney. Her twin sister Heba Abdel Gawad is also a synchronized swimmer, they competed together in women's duet event in 2000 Summer Games.

Olympic participation

Sydney 2000

References 

1982 births
Egyptian synchronized swimmers
Olympic synchronized swimmers of Egypt
Synchronized swimmers at the 2000 Summer Olympics
20th-century Egyptian people
Living people